Crowded House is the debut album by New Zealand-Australian band Crowded House. Produced by Mitchell Froom, it was released in August 1986 and was certified platinum in four countries. The album includes the hit singles "Don't Dream It's Over", "Something So Strong", "Mean to Me", "World Where You Live" and "Now We're Getting Somewhere".

At the 1986 Countdown Australian Music Awards the album won Best Debut Album. In December of 2021, the album was listed at no. 7 in Rolling Stone Australia's '200 Greatest Albums of All Time' countdown.

History
Following the breakup of Split Enz in 1984, Neil Finn and drummer Paul Hester decided to form a new band. Bass player Nick Seymour approached Finn during the after party for the Melbourne show of the Split Enz farewell tour and asked if he could try out for the new band. Former Swingers and soon-to-be Midnight Oil bass player Bones Hillman was also a candidate, but it was Seymour's playing on the demo for "That's What I Call Love" that earned him the spot. The group, then named The Mullanes, also included The Reels guitarist Craig Hooper, who left the band before they signed with Capitol Records. Capitol rejected the name "The Mullanes", as well as alternatives such as "Largest Living Things". The name Crowded House was adopted after the trio flew to Los Angeles to record the album and were provided with a very cramped apartment to live in.

The album's rhythm tracks were recorded by Larry Hirsh at Capitol Recording Studios, Los Angeles. The remaining recording sessions for the album were at Sunset Sound studios, where the group first collaborated with engineer Tchad Blake who also worked on the next two Crowded House albums. The album was mixed by Michael Frondelli at Studio 55. Seymour and Hester do not appear on "Now We're Getting Somewhere", which was recorded early in the sessions with drummer Jim Keltner and bass player Jerry Scheff.

The original New Zealand and Australia release of the album featured ten tracks; however, when the album was being prepared for export it was decided to include Crowded House's version of the Split Enz song "I Walk Away". At the same time the track listing was re-ordered and the song "Can't Carry On" was dropped from the album. After the release of the band's second album, Temple of Low Men, EMI re-released Crowded House internationally, using the original Australian/New Zealand track listing but with "I Walk Away" included too. This is now considered the "standard" track listing of for the album. A DualDisc version of this album was made available in 2005. The DVD side features a DVD-A version of the album with lyrics, a discography and the music videos for "Don't Dream It's Over" and "Something So Strong."

Original copies of the CD in Australia and New Zealand were made in Japan, but after the Disctronics B plant at Braeside was formed, it was manufactured there.

Track listing

Note
The original release of the album in Australia and New Zealand featured "Can't Carry On" as track 8. This song was replaced by a re-recording of the Split Enz song "I Walk Away" for other markets. Later re-issues of the album include both songs with the listing extended to 11 tracks, as above. EMI re-releases also have World Where You Live as the opening track, and Mean To Me as track 4.

2016 Deluxe Edition

Disc 1 (Original album)

Disc 2 (Unreleased and rare material)

Personnel

Crowded House 
 Neil Finn – lead vocals, acoustic piano, guitars
 Nick Seymour – bass
 Paul Hester – drums, backing vocals

Additional musicians 

 Mitchell Froom – keyboards
 Tim Pierce – guitars
 Jerry Scheff – bass ("Now We're Getting Somewhere")
 Jim Keltner – drums ("Now We're Getting Somewhere")
 Jorge Bermudez – percussion
 Heart Attack Horns – horns
 Noel Crombie – backing vocals
 Jim Gilstrap – backing vocals
 Andy Milton – backing vocals
 Joe Satriani – backing vocals

Production 

 Mitchell Froom – producer (1-7, 9, 10)
 Eddie Rayner – producer (8)
 Neil Finn – producer (8)
 Tchad Blake – engineer (1-7, 9, 10)
 Dennis Kirk – engineer (1-7, 9, 10)
 Chris Corr – engineer (8)
 Kaj Dahlstrom – engineer (8)
 Steve Himelfarb – assistant engineer (1-7, 9, 10)
 Larry Hirsh – rhythm track recording 
 Michael Frondelli – mixing
 Glen Golguin – mix assistant
 Wally Traugott – mastering 
 John O'Brien – art direction
 Nick Seymour – design, cover painting
 Dennis Keeley – photography

Charts

Weekly charts

Year-end charts

Certifications

Further reading

References and notes

External links
 Official Crowded House website

1986 debut albums
Crowded House albums
Albums produced by Mitchell Froom
Capitol Records albums
EMI Records albums
Albums recorded at Capitol Studios
Albums recorded at Sunset Sound Recorders
New wave albums by Australian artists